The Standard Fireworks Rajaratnam College for Women, is a women's general degree college located in Sivakasi, Tamil Nadu. It was established in the year 1968. The college is affiliated with Madurai Kamaraj University. This college offers different courses in arts, commerce and science.

Departments

Science

Physics
Chemistry
Mathematics
Computer Application
Botany
Zoology
Microbiology
Nutrition & Dietics

Arts and commerce

Tamil
English
Economics
Commerce

Accreditation
The college is  recognized by the University Grants Commission (UGC).

References

External links

Educational institutions established in 1968
1968 establishments in Madras State
Colleges affiliated to Madurai Kamaraj University